Paul Spargo (born 9 October 1966) is a former Australian rules footballer who played with North Melbourne and the Brisbane Bears in the Australian Football League (AFL). A half forward, he is the son of Footscray's Grand Final player Bob Spargo.

Originally from Albury, Spargo returned to coach the Albury Football Club in 1994, leading the team to the first of consecutive Ovens & Murray Football League (O&MFL) premierships the following year.  He left in 1997, but returned for a year in 2002.  Between 2003 and 2004 he was an assistant coach at the Richmond Football Club in the Australian Football League (AFL).  In 2009, he again returned to Albury, and lead them to three consecutive premierships, becoming the first man to coach five O&MFL premiership teams.

References

External links

1966 births
Living people
North Melbourne Football Club players
Brisbane Bears players
Coburg Football Club coaches
Albury Football Club players
Albury Football Club coaches
Australian rules footballers from Albury